Senayt Samuel (born 1969) is an Eritrean born photographer, based in London. Her work is informed by her family's deportation from Ethiopia and has been included in exhibitions at the Royal Festival Hall and Tate Britain in London.

Life and work
Samuel "was born in Asmara, Eritrea and raised in Addis Ababa, Ethiopia and New Haven, Connecticut." She studied Art History and Fine Arts at Paier College of Art in Hamden, Connecticut and at Southern Connecticut State University in New Haven. Whilst studying abroad as a teenager, her family were deported from Ethiopia, which is a topic that informs her work as a photographer. She moved to London in 2002, where she gained an MA in Photographic Studies from the University of Westminster.

She interned as a photojournalist at the New Haven Register then worked freelance as a photographer in Connecticut and New York.

Her Id series (2003) comprises portraits taken in front of mirrors.

She has a daughter, born in 2005.

Exhibitions

Solo exhibitions
People and Landscape of East Africa (Eritrea, Ethiopia and Kenya), Afro-American Cultural Center at Yale,  Yale University, New Haven, Connecticut, June–July 1999.

Group exhibitions
Imagine Art After, Tate Britain, London, October 2007 – January 2008. Work by Samuel, ‘Muyiwa Osifuye, Addisalem Bizuwork, Estabrak, and Denis Hyka and Violana Murataj. 
Reflections on the Self: Five African Women Photographers, Royal Festival Hall, Southbank Centre, London, March–April 2011; Lancaster Arts at Lancaster University, February–March 2012; The Brindley, November 2012–January 2013. Work by Samuel, Hélène Amouzou, Majida Khattari, Zanele Muholi and Nontsikelelo Veleko. Curated by Christine Eyene.

References

External links
A gallery at The Guardian which includes photographs from the exhibition Imagine Art After

Women photographers
Eritrean emigrants to England
People from New Haven, Connecticut
People from Addis Ababa
People from Asmara
Living people
1969 births